The International Centre is a multi-purpose convention centre in Mississauga, Ontario, Canada, located near Toronto Pearson International Airport. The International Centre is privately owned and hosts over 450 shows and events each year.

History
Opened in 1972, the centre's exhibit space nearly doubled from the original  following a major expansion and renovation in 2002.

The International Centre is closely linked to Canada's aviation history. During the 1950s, the site was the home of Orenda Engines Limited and was used in the development of the Iroquois jet engine for the Avro Arrow fighter aircraft. The site was purchased by a group of private investors from DeHavilland in 1971, which led to the development of its present use today, as a major multi-purpose facility.

Images

See also
 Enercare Centre
 Metro Toronto Convention Centre
 Toronto Congress Centre

References 

Convention centres in Canada
Buildings and structures in Mississauga